Jörg Syrlin may refer to:

 Jörg Syrlin the Elder (c. 1425 – 1491), German sculptor
 Jörg Syrlin the Younger (c. 1455 – 1521), German sculptor